The Helmet of Iron Gates is a Geto-Dacian silver helmet dating from the 4th century BC, housed in the Detroit Institute of Arts, United States.

It probably comes from Iron Gates area, in the  Mehedinți County, Romania. Formerly it was in the collection of Franz Tau, Vienna.

The helmet is similar to the Helmet of Coțofenești, Helmet of Peretu, Helmet of Agighiol and Helmet of Cucuteni-Băiceni, all being ancient Getian gold or silver helmets discovered so far on the territory of Romania.

Archaeological context 
It is referred to as “Iron Gates” as it was supposedly dredged out of the Danube in the Iron Gate gorge in 1913 or 1914. But, there is no documentary record of the Iron Gate material before 1931, the year in which the Agighiol burial was discovered containing the helmet nowadays named Agighiol helmet. It is probably that the so-called Iron Gates material was looted from the Agighiol grave shortly after its opening by local villagers. However, no other grave has been suggested for the "Iron Gate" helmet. And, In fact, it seems that both Agighiol and Iron Gates helmets had been made by the same workshop, or by the same silversmith. Also, it appears that punchmarks on the helmets had been made by the same tool.

Iconography 
The design is sufficiently unusual in ancient art to offer the opportunity to trace it to its origin, and, thereby, provide some insight into the elements that went into the formation of early Dacian art and the means by which ancient Oriental motifs survived and were transmitted into Europe. Almost identical in decoration and details of craftsmanship are the two silver beakers, now in Bucharest and New York, that reputedly came from the region of the Iron Gates. The other designs chased on the helmet are clearly within the Scythian sphere. The helmet type is related to and probably a little earlier in date than the gold helmet in Bucharest which shows some Sarmatian aspects. Lacking evidence of comparable helmets in the Scythian homeland, we may assign this helmet to a local development of a helmet type found in Kuban dating in the early years of the fifth century B. C, with the addition of some Greek features.

The “apotropaic” eyes 

The most striking feature of the helmet that is found in all five Getian helmets is their so-called “apotropaic” eyes, which could have looked out as a second set from immediately above the real eyes of the wearer.  Such eyes were considered to be a borrowing from the Greek world where greaves and shields have eyes that have been considered truly apotropaic, serving to divert evil. However, it is argued that the helmets display the feature of doubling of attributes. Besides the eyes, there is the stag depicted with eight legs that is interpreted as “I run twice as fast”. Therefore, the “apotropaic eyes” could say : I see twice as well.

The predatory motif 

The motif in question is that of a predatory bird with a great round eye and folded wing, grasping in its enormous claw a hare while a fish dangles from its beak. The beakers that reputedly came from the region of the Iron Gates (now reposited in Bucharest and New York museum) carry the same eagle-hare motif.

See also 
 Getae
 Dacia
 History of Romania

References

Further reading 

 DIA Bulletin, vol 36, no 3, 1956–57, p 68 (ill).
 Piggott, S., Ancient Europe, Chicago: Aldine, 1965, pp 224–6 (ill), as Dacian 3rd-2nd second century B.C.
 Berciu, Dumitru, Arta traco-getică, Bibliotega de Archeologie, v 14, Bucharest, Editura Academiei Republicii Socialiste Romania, pp 83–88 (ill).
 Rosu, L., CONSILIUL CULTURII SI EDUCATIEI SOCIALISTE REVISTA MUZEELOR SI MONUMENTALOR, Bucharest, 1975, no 12, 2:55-59 (ill).
 Nickel, H., ULLSTEIN WAFFENBUCH, Frankfurt, 1974, p 60 (ill).
 Farkas, Anne E., "Style and Subject Matter in Native Thracian Art," METROPOLITAN MUSEUM JOURNAL, vol 16, 1981, pp 33–48, p 34 for mention of helmet associated with the Getae and Triballi tribes of northern Thrace.
 Meyers, Pieter, "Three Silver Objects from Thrace: A Technical Examination," METROLPOLITAN MUSEUM JOURNAL, vol 16, 1981, pp 49–54.
 Goldman, B., "A Scythian Helmet from the Danube", DIA Bulletin, vol 42, no 4, 1963, pp 63–71 (ill).
 Goldman, B., "Late Scythian Art in the West: The Detroit Helmet," IPEK, vol 22, 1966–69, pp 67–76.
 Rosu, L., "Thraco-Getae-Dacian Art Works In The Detroit Institute of Arts," ROMANIANS CELEBRATING ONTARIO: HERITAGE FESTIVAL, Toronto, 1984, pp 166–168.
 "Family Art Game: Details, Details, Details," DIA Advertising Supplement, The Detroit Free Press, April 29, 1990, p. 25 (ill.).
 "A Visitors Guide: The Detroit Institute of Arts", ed. Julia P. Henshaw (Detroit 1995), p. 101 (ill.)
 A. Fol et al., "The Rogozen Treasure", Sofia, 1989, p. 42 compares Rogozan Beaker #165 to the Metropolitan Museum beaker, the two cups from Aghigol and the Detroit helmet in the iconography of the horned bird of prey which symbolizes ad deity with supernatural powers to defeat evil. p. 194 Author says that the Metropolitan Museum beaker and the Detroit helmet may have been found near Rogozen.

External links 

 DIA helmet page
 Gold and Silver Armour of the Getian-Dacian Elite. Military Equipment and Organization.
 Article on the helmet  

Military history of Dacia
Archaeological discoveries in Romania
Dacian culture
Ancient helmets
Thracian archaeological artifacts
Collections of the Detroit Institute of Arts
4th century BC in Romania
Individual helmets